Señorita República Dominicana 1978 was held on December 14, 1977. There were 28 candidates who competed for the national crown. The winner represented the Dominican Republic at the Miss Universe 1978. The Señorita República Dominicana Mundo will enter Miss World 1978. Only contestants for 27 provinces and one municipality entered. For the top 10 they showed their evening gown and answered questions so they could go to the top 5. In the top 5 they answered more questions.

Results

 Señorita República Dominicana 1978: Raquel Josefina Jacobo Jaar (María Trinidad Sánchez)
 Señorita República Dominicana Mundo: Jenny del Carmen Polanco Rivera (Puerto Plata)
 1st Runner Up: Caridad Cabrera (San Cristóbal)
 2nd Runner Up: Aurora Rodríguez (La Altagracia)
 3rd Runner Up: Isaura Medina (Santiago)

Top 10

 Isabel Hoepelman (Distrito Nacional)
 María de Jesus (Barahona)
 Janet Williams (La Romana)
 Sandra Suarez (Salcedo)
 Andreina Fontan (Duarte)

Special awards
 Miss Rostro Bello: Caridad Cabrera (San Cristóbal)
 Miss Photogenic (voted by press reporters): Milka Taveras (Espaillat)
 Miss Congeniality (voted by Miss Dominican Republic Universe contestants): Maria Luisa Hernandez (Santiago Rodríguez)
 Best Provincial Costume: Fiorela Ramírez (Pedernales)

Delegates

 Azua: Wilma de Alba Abreu Bircann
 Baoruco: Laura Flores Guzman Xavier
 Barahona: Ana María de Jesús Cury
 Dajabón: Alejandra Cindy Zamora Tobias
 Distrito Nacional: Isabel del Carmen Hoepelman Tactuk
 Duarte: Carmen Andreina Fontan Martínez
 Elías Piña: María José Duarte Languasco
 Espaillat: Milka Ceneyda Taveras Polanco
 Independencia: Iris María Arias Joubert
 La Altagracia: María Aurora Rodríguez Tajas
 La Romana: Janet Magdalena Williams Brito
 La Vega: María Valentina Cruz Cadiz
 María Trinidad Sánchez: Raquel Josefina Jacobo Jaar
 Monte Cristi: Juana María Peralta Quiñonez
 Pedernales: Fiorela Estefania Ramírez Diaz
 Peravia: Ana Carolina Taveras Ruiz
 Puerto Plata: Jenny del Carmen Polanco Rivera
 Salcedo: Sandra Yamilka Suarez de las Casas
 Samaná: María Teresa Toledo Messina
 Sánchez Ramírez: Iluminada María Tobias Rosado
 San Cristóbal: Caridad Elizabeth Cabrera Santana
 San Juan de la Maguana: Magdalena Reyna German Canaán
 San Pedro de Macorís: Rosemary Casandra Ramos Reyes
 Santiago: Isaura María Medina Hernandez
 Santiago Rodríguez: Tatiana de los Angeles Caba Abikaram
 Seibo: María Caridad Tavarez Britanico
 Santo Domingo de Guzmán: María Luisa Hernandez Gomez
 Valverde: Carmen Ines Rojas Padron

Miss Dominican Republic
1978 beauty pageants
1978 in the Dominican Republic